The Schön scandal concerns German physicist Jan Hendrik Schön (born August 1970 in Verden an der Aller, Lower Saxony, Germany) who briefly rose to prominence after a series of apparent breakthroughs with semiconductors that were later discovered to be fraudulent. Before he was exposed, Schön had received the Otto-Klung-Weberbank Prize for Physics and the Braunschweig Prize in 2001, as well as the Outstanding Young Investigator Award of the Materials Research Society in 2002, all of which were later rescinded.

The scandal provoked discussion in the scientific community about the degree of responsibility of coauthors and reviewers of scientific articles. The debate centered on whether peer review, traditionally designed to find errors and determine relevance and originality of articles, should also be required to detect deliberate fraud.

Rise to prominence

Schön's field of research was condensed matter physics and nanotechnology. He received his PhD from the University of Konstanz in 1997. In late 1997, he was hired by Bell Labs, where he worked on electronics in which conventional semiconducting elements (such as silicon) were replaced by crystalline organic (meaning carbon-based) materials. Schön, however, claimed spectacular ability in changing the conductivity of the organic materials, far beyond anything achieved thus far. His measurements in most cases confirmed various theoretical predictions, notably that the organic materials could be made to display superconductivity or be used in lasers. The findings were published in prominent scientific publications, including the journals Science and Nature, and gained worldwide attention. However, no research group anywhere in the world succeeded in reproducing the results claimed by Schön.

In 2001, he was listed as an author on an average of one newly published research paper every eight days. In the same year, he announced in Nature that he had produced a transistor on the molecular scale. Schön claimed to have used a thin layer of organic dye molecules to assemble an electric circuit that, when acted on by an electric current, behaved as a transistor. The implications of his work were significant. It would have been the beginning of a move away from silicon-based electronics and towards organic electronics. It would have allowed transistors to continue shrinking past the point at which silicon breaks down, and therefore continue Moore's law for much longer than was then predicted. It also would have drastically reduced the cost of electronics.

A key element in Schön's work claimed successful observation of various physical phenomena in organic materials was dependent on the transistor setup. Specifically, Schön claimed to use a thin layer of aluminium oxide which he incorporated into his transistors using lab facilities at the University of Konstanz. However, while the equipment and materials used were common in laboratories all over the world, none succeeded in preparing aluminium oxide layers of similar quality to the ones claimed by Schön.

Allegations and investigation
Soon after Schön published his work on single-molecule semiconductors, others in the physics community alleged that his data contained anomalies. Julia Hsu and Lynn Loo originally noticed problems with Schön's paper describing the assembly of molecular transistors whilst attempting to patent research on lithography, realizing that Schön had duplicated figures. Hsu and Loo had attempted initial experiments to gather evidence for their patent but relied on the scientific outcomes of Schön's work. It was not until April 19, 2002, when Loo and Hsu were meeting with their patent lawyer John McCabe that they noticed the duplicated data. Lydia Sohn, then of Princeton University, noticed that two experiments carried out at very different temperatures had identical noise. When the editors of Nature pointed this out to Schön, he claimed to have accidentally submitted the same graph twice. Paul McEuen of Cornell University then found the same noise in a paper describing a third experiment. More research by McEuen, Sohn, Lynn Loo, and other physicists uncovered a number of examples of duplicate data in Schön's work. This triggered a series of reactions that quickly led Lucent Technologies (which ran Bell Labs) to start a formal investigation.

In May 2002, Bell Labs set up a committee to investigate, with Malcolm Beasley from Stanford University as chair. The committee obtained information from all of Schön's coauthors and interviewed the three principal ones (Zhenan Bao, Bertram Batlogg and Christian Kloc). It examined electronic drafts of the disputed articles, which included processed numeric data. The committee requested copies of the raw data, but found that Schön had kept no laboratory notebooks. His raw data files had been erased from his computer. According to Schön, the files were erased because his computer had limited hard drive space. In addition, all of his experimental samples had been discarded or damaged beyond repair.

On September 25, 2002, the committee publicly released its report. The report contained details of 24 allegations of misconduct on Schön's part. They found evidence of scientific misconduct in at least 16 of them while the remaining 8 were unrelated to publications or troubling but lacked compelling evidence of misconduct. They found that whole data sets had been reused in a number of different experiments. They also found that some of his graphs, which purportedly had been plotted from experimental data, had instead been produced using mathematical functions.

The report found that all of the misdeeds had been performed by Schön alone. All of the coauthors (including Bertram Batlogg, who was the head of the team) were exonerated of scientific misconduct. This sparked widespread debate in the scientific community on how the blame for misconduct should be distributed among co-authors, particularly when they share a significant part of the credit.

Aftermath and sanctions
Schön acknowledged that the data were incorrect in many of these articles. He claimed that the substitutions could have occurred by honest mistake. He omitted some data and stated that he did so to show more convincing evidence for behavior that he observed.

Researchers at Delft University of Technology and the Thomas J. Watson Research Center have since performed experiments similar to Schön's, without achieving similar results. Even before the allegations had become public, several research groups had tried to reproduce most of his spectacular results in the field of the physics of organic molecular materials without success.

In June 2004 the University of Konstanz issued a press release stating that Schön's doctoral degree had been revoked due to "dishonourable conduct". Department of Physics spokesman Wolfgang Dieterich called the affair the "biggest fraud in physics in the last 50 years" and said that the "credibility of science had been brought into disrepute". Schön appealed the ruling, but on October 28, 2009, it was upheld by the university. In response, Schön sued the university and appeared in court to testify on September 23, 2010. The court overturned the university's decision on September 27, 2010. However, in November 2010 the university moved to appeal the court's ruling. The state court ruled in September 2011 that the university was correct in revoking his doctorate. The Federal Administrative Court upheld the state court's decision in July 2013, and the Federal Constitutional Court confirmed it in September 2014.

In October 2004, the Deutsche Forschungsgemeinschaft (DFG, the German Research Foundation) Joint Committee announced sanctions against him. The former DFG post-doctorate fellow was deprived of his active right to vote in DFG elections or serve on DFG committees for an eight-year period. During that period, Schön was also unable to serve as a peer reviewer or apply for DFG funds.

Schön returned to Germany and took a job at an engineering firm.

Withdrawn journal articles
On October 31, 2002, Science withdrew eight articles written by Schön:
 
 
 
 
 
 
 
 

On December 20, 2002, Physical Review withdrew six articles written by Schön:
 
 
 
 
 
 

On February 24, 2003, Applied Physics Letters withdrew four articles written by Schön:
 
 
 
 

On March 5, 2003, Nature withdrew seven articles written by Schön:
 
 
 
 
 
 
 

On March 20, 2003, Advanced Materials withdrew two articles written by Schön:
 
 

On May 2, 2003, Science withdrew another article written by Schön:

Further questionable journal articles
The retraction notices from February 24, 2003, in Applied Physics Letters relayed concerns about seven articles written by Schön and published in the Applied Physics Letters:

The retraction notice from March 20, 2003, in Advanced Materials mentions concerns about another article written by Schön:

See also
 Bogdanov affair (in 2002)
 Hwang Woo-suk (human embryonic stem cell controversy in 2005)
 Haruko Obokata (STAP cell controversy in 2014)
 List of experimental errors and frauds in physics
 List of scientific misconduct incidents
 Plastic Fantastic: How the Biggest Fraud in Physics Shook the Scientific World
 Scientific misconduct

References

Further reading
 
  Book review of Plastic Fantastic
 
  Provides a plausible reconstruction

External links
 
 
 Investigation Finds that One Lucent Physicist Engaged in Scientific Misconduct Physics Today, 2002
 NPR Science Friday report (10/18/2002)
  Author who interviewed 126 scientists and journal editors about Schön's frauds.

2001 hoaxes
Academic scandals
Hoaxes in Germany
Hoaxes in science
Scientific misconduct incidents